Četvrti Jul is a neighbourhood of Zrenjanin, Serbia. It is located some 1.5 kilometres to southeast from the city centre. It is residential area, consisting of 50 buildings with 4 or 5 storey each, in the street of the same name (Četvrtog jula). Population of the neighbourhood is just over 3,000 inhabitants. Boundaries of the neighbourhood are: Pančevačka, Dositeja Obradovića and Dr. Laze Kostića streets and railway.

Name
After the fall of communism, the neighbourhood kept its name, which means "Fourth of July", which was the date of state holiday in the former, socialist, Yugoslavia. In a referendum, in the early nineties, inhabitants refused to change the name of the street into Despota Stefana, but a nearby street got that name.

Geography and population
Surrounding neighbourhoods are: Lesnina, north-wards, Ruža Šulman, west-wards, and Žitni Trg, further north-westwards. Together with "Četvrti Jul" they make up inner city local community "Dositej Obradović", which have 13,000 inhabitants. Local community occupies southeast part of the city. It has the largest population of all local communities in the city. Serbs are absolute majority in it, with large Hungarian minority. There are, also, other nationalities.

Features
In the neighbourhood of "Četvrti Jul", or in its edges, together with Šećerana and area towards central bus station, are: seat of the local community, elementary school "Dositej Obradović", 2 kindergartens, General Practitioner's office, 2 supermarkets, few 
bars and restaurants, many shops, indoor and outdoor swimming pools, football field, few basketball, handball and volleyball courts, few parks, main bus station.

Nearby are: Post office, Police station and green market (Lesnina); another elementary school "2.Oktobar", 2 kindergartens.

It is widely considered that "Četvrti Jul" is developed urban neighbourhood.

See also 
Zrenjanin

Zrenjanin